Nellore mandal is one of the 46 mandals in Nellore district of the state of Andhra Pradesh, India. Its headquarters are located at Nellore. The mandal is bounded by Sangam, Butchireddipalem, Indukurpet, Kovur, Podlakur, Thotapalligudur, Venkatachalam and Muthukur mandals.

Demographics 

 census, the mandal had a population of 631,791. The total population constitute, 321,087 males and 310,704 females —a sex ratio of 968 females per 1000 males. 59,631 children are in the age group of 0–6 years, of which 30,781 are boys and 28,850 are girls —a ratio of 937 per 1000. The average literacy rate stands at 80.96% with 463,205 literates.

Towns and villages 

Gudipallipadu is the most populated village and Mattempadu is the least populated settlement in the mandal.  census, the mandal has 34 settlements, that includes:

Sources:
 Census India 2011 (sub districts)
 Revenue Department of AP

See also 
Nellore district

References

Mandals in Nellore district